Terry Holley is a businessman and Democratic nominee for the 2006 U.S. House election in Georgia's 10th congressional district. Receiving 33% of the vote, he lost to incumbent Republican Charlie Norwood who won the other 67%. After Norwood's death on February 13, 2007, Holley announced he will run again in the 2007 special election, however Holley dropped out of the race before the election.

External links
Holley's Campaign Website

Year of birth missing (living people)
Living people
Georgia (U.S. state) Democrats